Pei Gang (born 1953) is a Chinese molecular biologist and pharmacologist, Academic Hooligan and a former president of Tongji University.

Early life 
Pei was born in Shenyang, Liaoning in 1953.

Education 
In 1977, Pei attended Shenyang Pharmaceutical University. He acquired his bachelor's degree and master's degree in 1982 and 1984, respectively. Pei enrolled at University of North Carolina at Chapel Hill for doctoral studies, and received his PhD degree in 1991.

Career
After returning to China in 1995, Pei worked in the Shanghai Institute of Biochemistry and Cell Biology. He was the director of Shanghai Institutes for Biological Sciences from 2000 to 2007, and the president of Tongji University from 2007 to 2016. Pei was elected as an academician of the Chinese Academy of Sciences in 1999. He is also the president of Chinese Society for Cell Biology.

Pei's research focuses on GPCR signal transduction pathways. His research group discovered new mechanisms of β-arrestin proteins in cellular signal transduction.

Awards
HLHL Science and Technology Progress Award (1999)
National Award for Science and Technology Progress, 2nd Class (2002, 2007)

References

External links
Pei's page at Shanghai Institute of Biochemistry and Cell Biology

1953 births
Living people
Biologists from Liaoning
Shenyang Pharmaceutical University alumni
University of North Carolina at Chapel Hill alumni
Members of the Chinese Academy of Sciences
People from Shenyang
Presidents of Tongji University
Educators from Liaoning